Aziz Salah Binous (born 4 August 2000) is a Swiss professional footballer who plays as a forward for YF Juventus.

Professional career
On 12 July 2018, Binous signed his first professional contract with his childhood club FC Lugano. Binous made his professional debut in a 2–0 Swiss Super League loss to BSC Young Boys on 29 July 2018.

On 18 January 2019, Binous was loaned out to FC Zürich with an option to buy him permanently. Binous was registered in the U21 squad of the club, however, he got his debut for the first team at the end of March 2019.

On 13 July 2021, he joined Kriens on loan.

International career
Born in Switzerland, Binous is of Tunisian descent. He represented the Switzerland U20s in 2019, scoring on his debut.

References

External links
 
 Profile

2000 births
Sportspeople from Lugano
Swiss people of Tunisian descent
Living people
Swiss men's footballers
Association football forwards
Switzerland youth international footballers
FC Lugano players
FC Zürich players
FC Luzern players
SC Kriens players
SC Young Fellows Juventus players
Swiss Super League players
2. Liga Interregional players
Swiss Promotion League players
Swiss 1. Liga (football) players
Swiss Challenge League players